Joseph Gurney Cannon (May 7, 1836 – November 12, 1926) was an American politician from Illinois and leader of the Republican Party.  Cannon served as Speaker of the United States House of Representatives from 1903 to 1911, and many consider him to be the most dominant speaker in United States history, with such control over the House that he could often control debate. The Cannon House Office Building, the oldest congressional office building, completed in 1908, was named for him in 1962.

Early life
Cannon was born in Guilford County, North Carolina, and in 1840 moved with his parents to Annapolis, Indiana, about 30 miles north of Terre Haute. He was the elder of two sons of Gulielma (née Hollingsworth) and Horace Franklin Cannon, a country doctor. When Joseph was 15, Horace Cannon drowned on August 7, 1851, as he tried to reach a sick patient by crossing a creek. Young Cannon took charge of the family farm, and his brother William later became a successful banker and realtor.

Asked by Terre Haute politician and lawyer John Palmer Usher, future Secretary of the Interior under President Abraham Lincoln, to testify in a slander case, Cannon became fascinated with the law. Eventually, he asked Usher if he could study law under him and moved to Terre Haute. At age 19 he traveled to Cincinnati, Ohio, to attend a semester of law school at the University of Cincinnati law school. In 1858, he was admitted to the bar and commenced practice in Terre Haute, Indiana, but was disappointed when Usher refused to offer him a place in his office. That year he relocated to Tuscola, Illinois. His choice of a new hometown was somewhat involuntary, taking place while he was travelling from Shelbyville, Illinois, to Chicago to find more clients for his law firm. During the trip, he ran out of money. He boarded a Chicago-bound train in Mattoon, Illinois; after the train had started, he was asked for his ticket. As Cannon did not have a ticket, he was removed from the train in Tuscola. There, he became State's attorney for the twenty-seventh judicial district of Illinois, holding the position from March 1861 to December 1868. He was one of the charter members of Tuscola's Masonic Lodge No. 332, which was founded on October 2, 1860.

In 1876 Cannon moved to Danville, Illinois, where he resided for the rest of his life. He and his wife Mary P. Reed, whom he married in 1862, had two daughters.

Political career

He became a follower of Abraham Lincoln during the Lincoln–Douglas debates of 1858. After Lincoln was elected President in 1860, Cannon received an appointment as a regional prosecutor. Cannon, a member of the Republican Party, was elected to the United States House of Representatives from Illinois to the 42nd and to the eight succeeding Congresses (March 4, 1873 – March 3, 1891), and was the chairman of the Committee on Expenditures in the Post Office Department (47th Congress) and of the Committee on Appropriations (51st Congress). Cannon was an unsuccessful candidate for reelection in 1890 to the 52nd Congress, but was elected to the 53rd and to the nine succeeding Congresses that sat between 1893 and 1913.

He attempted to gain the Speakership four times before succeeding. His antic speaking style, diminutive stature and pugnacious manner were his trademarks. The newspapers frequently lampooned him as a colorful rube. "Uncle Joe", as he was known, often clashed with fellow Republican Theodore Roosevelt, asserting that Roosevelt "has no more use for the Constitution than a tomcat has for a marriage license".

Cannon was chairman of the Committee on Appropriations (54th through 57th Congresses), Committee on Rules (58th through 61st Congresses), and Speaker of the House of Representatives (58th through 61st Congresses). He received 58 votes for the presidential nomination at the Republican National Convention at Chicago in 1908.

Speaker of the House

Cannon wielded the office of Speaker with unprecedented power. At the time of Cannon's election, the Speaker of the House concurrently held the chair of the Rules Committee, which determined under what rules and restrictions bills could be debated, amended, and voted on, and, in some cases, whether they would be allowed on the floor at all. As such, Cannon effectively controlled every aspect of the House's agenda: bills reached the floor of the house only if Cannon approved of them, and then in whatever form he determined – with Cannon himself deciding whether and to what extent the measures could be debated and amended.

Cannon also reserved to himself the right to appoint not only the chairs of the various House committees, but also all of the committees' members, and (despite the seniority system that had begun to develop) used that power to appoint his allies and proteges to leadership positions while punishing those who opposed his legislation. Crucially, Cannon exercised these powers to maintain discipline within the ranks of his own party: the Republicans were divided into the conservative "Old Guard," led by Cannon, and the progressives, led by President Theodore Roosevelt. His committee assignment privileges ensured that the party's Progressive element had little influence in the House, and his control over the legislative process obstructed progressive legislation.

Revolt
On March 17, 1910, after two failed attempts to curb Cannon's absolute power in the House, Nebraska Representative George Norris led a coalition of 42 progressive Republicans and the entire delegation of 149 Democrats in a revolt. With many of Cannon's most powerful allies absent from the Chamber, but enough Members on hand for a quorum, Norris introduced a resolution that would remove the Speaker from the Rules Committee and strip him of his power to assign committees.

While his lieutenants and the House sergeant-at-arms left the chamber to collect absent members in an attempt to rally enough votes for Cannon, the Speaker's allies initiated a legislative block in the form of a point of order debate. When Cannon supporters proved difficult to find (many of the staunchest were Irish and spent the day at various St. Patrick's Day celebrations), the filibuster continued for 26 hours, with Cannon's present friends making repeated motions for recess and adjournment. When Cannon finally ruled the resolution out of order at noon on March 19, Norris appealed the resolution to the full House, which voted to overrule Cannon and then to adopt the Norris resolution.

Cannon managed to save some face by promptly requesting a vote on a motion to vacate to remove him as Speaker, which he won handily since the Republican majority would not risk a Democratic speaker replacing him. However, his iron rule of the House was broken, and when the Democrats won control of the House in the 1910 midterm elections, the Republican caucus pushed Cannon from leadership altogether prior to the start of the 62nd Congress.

Cannon is to date the second-longest continuously serving Republican Speaker in history, after another Illinoisan, Dennis Hastert, who surpassed him on June 1, 2006.

Post-Speaker

Cannon was defeated in 1912 but returned in 1914 and was re-elected each congressional election until 1920.  He was a critic of President Woodrow Wilson and U.S. entry into World War I. He was also an outspoken critic of Wilson's League of Nations.

Cannon declined to run in the 1922 congressional election, and retired at the end of his last term in 1923; he was featured on the cover of the first issue of Time magazine on the last day of his last term in office.

Cannon is to date the second longest-serving Republican Representative, surpassed only by Alaska congressman Don Young, and also was the first member of Congress of either party ever to surpass 40 years of service (non-consecutive). His congressional career spanned 46 years of cumulative service, a concurrent 50 years, barring two terms after which he came back—a record not broken until 1959. He is the longest-serving member ever of the House of Representatives in Illinois, although the longest continuous service belongs to Adolph J. Sabath. He served in the House during the terms of 11 presidents, a record he shares with John Dingell and Jamie Whitten.

Personal life
Born a Quaker, he became a Methodist after leaving Congress. However, he may have been effectively a Methodist long before this. After marrying Mary Reed in a Methodist service in 1862, a Quaker encouraged him to express regret for this, to which Cannon replied, "If you mean that I am to get up in meeting and say that I am sorry I married Mary, I won't do it. I'm damned if I'm sorry and I'm damned if I will say I am." Joseph Cannon died in his residence in Danville, Vermilion County, Illinois. He had a weakened heart and also suffered from the general effects of old age.  Cannon died at noon on Friday, November 12, 1926, while in a deep sleep. He was buried in Spring Hill Cemetery.

Legacy
 Cannon brought a federal Veterans Administration Hospital to Danville; it continues to serve military veterans.
 The first building of offices for congressmen outside of the United States Capitol building was named after Cannon.
 Cannon signed the Sixteenth Amendment which established Congress' right to impose a federal income tax without apportionment among the states and without regard to any census or enumeration.
 List of people on the cover of Time magazine (1920s), March 3, 1923

See also
 1908 Republican National Convention
 1908 United States presidential election
 List of Republican National Conventions

References

Further reading
 Bolles, Blair. Tyrant from Illinois: Uncle Joe Cannon's Experiment with Personal Power (1951)
 Busbey, L. White. Uncle Joe Cannon, The Story of a Pioneer American (1927)—His (auto)biography
 Roger, Scott William. "Uncle Joe Cannon: The Brakeman of the House of Representatives, 1903–1911" in Raymond W Smock and Susan W Hammond, eds. Masters of the House: Congressional Leadership Over Two Centuries (1998), pp. 33–62

External links

 The Joseph Gurney Cannon Papers are housed at the Abraham Lincoln Presidential Library and Museum.

1836 births
1926 deaths
20th-century American politicians
Candidates in the 1908 United States presidential election
Conservatism in the United States
Converts to Methodism
Deans of the United States House of Representatives
Illinois lawyers
Indiana lawyers
People from Danville, Illinois
People from Guilford County, North Carolina
People from Parke County, Indiana
People from Tuscola, Illinois
Republican Party members of the United States House of Representatives from Illinois
Speakers of the United States House of Representatives